The action of 22 July 1713 was a naval battle between Sweden and the Tsardom of Russia which took place on 22 July 1713 near the shallows of Kalbådagrund. It was an indecisive engagement, part of the Great Northern War.

Ships involved

Sweden

Russia

Prelude
Small Swedish squadron led by Commander Carl Raab consisting of three ships of the line encountered on 10 July 1713 much larger Russian squadron near Gogland who gave chase to the Swedes withdrawing towards west.

Battle
Early on the 11 July faster Russian ships had gained the Swedish squadron and reached firing distance. Intense fight took place near Kalbådagrund and Yttre Hällkallan shallows. During the fight Raab's flagship Ösel run aground but could swiftly detach itself and rejoin the fight. Three Russian ships following also run aground, one of them so badly that it could not be pulled free and had to be torched. Swedish ships had suffered only superficial damage and withdraw to Helsinki while Russian squadron lost 50 gun ship of the line Viborg.

References

Bibliography

Hogland 1713
1713 in Europe
Hogland 1713
Hogland 1713
Gulf of Finland